"Tis the Fifteenth Season" is the seventh episode of the fifteenth season of the American animated television series The Simpsons, and the seventh Christmas-themed episode overall. It first aired on the Fox network in the United States on December 14, 2003.

This episode is notable as being the first to make reference to Lisa's Buddhism since she converted in an earlier Christmas episode, "She of Little Faith".

Plot
At the Springfield Nuclear Power Plant, the employees of Sector 7G have a Secret Santa. Homer receives a DVD player and the first series of Magnum P.I. from Carl, but Homer himself, at the very last moment, gets Lenny a wrap of Certs from the vending machine, much to everybody's chagrin. Instead of a Christmas bonus, Mr. Burns gives Homer a Joe DiMaggio baseball card. He sells it to Comic Book Guy and earns a small fortune, then takes the family Christmas shopping at upmarket shops. Homer promises to buy a large Christmas tree, but instead spends the majority of the money on a talking astrolabe for himself, meaning that the only Christmas tree Homer can buy with the leftover money is a cheap, dry, twig-like tree that catches fire if rubbed; after hearing the astrolabe talk, the family are disappointed by his selfish behavior. That night, after being made to sleep on the couch by Marge, Homer watches Mr. McGrew's Christmas Carol and after imagining seeing his name in the show, realizes that he must change his ways.

Now more charitable, Homer apologizes for his mistakes, donates his old clothes to the homeless shelter, gives Marge the last porkchop at dinner, and builds a public skating rink in his backyard, as well as giving Lenny a decent Christmas present to make up for the Secret Santa: a cube made of photographs of Lenny and his friends. At church, Ned Flanders becomes jealous of Homer's position as the new nicest person in town, and sets out to buy gifts for everyone to regain the title. Meanwhile, Lisa tells Homer about her Buddhist beliefs that people would be happier without material goods. For his next 'good deed', on Christmas Eve night, Homer sneaks into the citizens' houses and steals their presents. In the morning, an angry mob confronts Homer and Flanders. Flanders calms them by reciting a Bible verse, while Homer shows a Christmas star (in reality, a distress flare fired by Hans Moleman), before he and Ned give everyone back their presents and everybody sings "Hark! The Herald Angels Sing". The episode ends with Snake stealing Homer's astrolabe and running away.

Production
The episode was written by Michael Price, who has cited "Homer's summation of what Christmas means" as his favorite contribution to the show. He has said that the speech "pretty much stayed that way through all drafts of the episode."

Cultural references
Mr. McGrew's Christmas Carol is a parody of Mr. Magoo's Christmas Carol.
Christmas with the California Prunes is a clear takeoff of The California Raisins, as well as the A Claymation Christmas Celebration that featured them.
The other versions of A Christmas Carol that are seen in TV are parodies of Family Matters and Star Trek.
The montage in which Homer takes all the presents from Springfield strongly references the How the Grinch Stole Christmas! TV special. In fact, a parody of the song "You're a Mean One, Mr. Grinch" (sung by Dan Castallaneta) can be heard during the montage.
The Year Santa Got Lost, which Homer briefly sees on TV, is a parody of the Rankin/Bass stop-motion Christmas specials. The character of Mr. Mailman (voiced by Jimmy Stewart) is based on S. D. Kluger from Santa Claus is Comin' to Town, and several of the Misfit Toys from Rudolph the Red-Nosed Reindeer (Charlie-in-the-Box, Dolly, Spotted Elephant, Train with Square Wheels, Jelly Pistol, and the plane that can't fly) make cameo appearances.
Towards the end of the episode Ned Flanders begins to recite from the Gospel of Luke, (chapter 2 verse 8), similarly to Linus in A Charlie Brown Christmas.
Moe's face is featured on Rembrandt's The Anatomy Lesson of Dr. Nicolaes Tulp.
The store shown as Abercrombie & Rich is a parody of the popular American brand Abercrombie & Fitch.
Homer mentions Tuesdays with Morrie, a book and later a television film starring Hank Azaria, who voices many of the supporting characters in The Simpsons.
Marge shops at a store named "Victor's Secret", which is a reference to Victoria's Secret, the popular lingerie store.
Homer believes Jesus sang "Stairway to Heaven", instead of Led Zeppelin.

Reception
On November 2, 2004, the episode was released in the United States on a DVD collection titled The Simpsons Christmas 2, along with the season twelve episodes "Homer vs. Dignity" and "Skinner's Sense of Snow" and the season fourteen episode "Dude, Where's My Ranch?".

While reviewing the DVD, Brian James of PopMatters wrote that Tis the Fifteenth Season" is "hardly a masterpiece, but it does feature a talking astrolabe and the phrase 'double-bacon genius-burger,' two elements that deserve a spot in Simpson Valhalla. It's a shame that such entries don't come as fast and furious as they did a decade ago, but that The Simpsons does offer a few belly laughs now and then, rather than being a complete embarrassment this late in the game is a bigger accomplishment than anyone gives it credit for. It's still just a cartoon, and still a pretty good one."

Kyle Ryan of The A.V. Club praised the episode for "strik[ing] a nice balance between sharp satire and real heart."

References

External links

American Christmas television episodes
The Simpsons (season 15) episodes
2003 American television episodes